Alfredo Varela Jr. (born Alfredo Varela Catalá; November 30, 1912 – May 1, 1986) was a Mexican screenwriter and actor best known for his comic screenplays.

Selected filmography
 Here's the Point (1940)
 The Unknown Policeman (1941)
 I'm a Real Mexican (1942)
 Divorced (1943)
 María Eugenia (1943)
 El Ametralladora (1943)
 Mischievous Susana (1945)
 The Genius (1948)
 Nocturne of Love (1948)
 Love for Love (1950)
 We Maids (1951)
 The Loving Women (1953)
 The Bandits of Cold River (1956)
 A Few Drinks (1958)
 Vacations in Acapulco (1961)
El ojo de vidrio (1969)
Vuelve el ojo de vidrio (1970)
La presidenta municipal (1975)
La comadrita (1978)

References

Bibliography 
 Rogelio Agrasánchez. Guillermo Calles: A Biography of the Actor and Mexican Cinema Pioneer. McFarland, 2010.

External links 
 

1912 births
1986 deaths
People from Mexico City
Mexican people of Galician descent
Mexican male film actors
20th-century Mexican male actors
20th-century Mexican screenwriters
20th-century Mexican male writers